Notice (released 1981 in Norway by Odin Records - ODIN LP 01) is a studioalbum (LP) by the Norwegian guitarist Thorgeir Stubø awarded Spellemannprisen 1981, as the Jazz album of the year.

Critical reception 
This is the first album by Thorgeir Stubø, and was released in 1981. He picked a handful of Northern Norwegian jazz musicians, along with saxophonist Henning Gravrok, bassist Bjørn Alterhaug, pianist Terje Bjørklund and the young drummer Ernst-Wiggo Sandbakk, and delivered an album of music that he later described as "light Chick Corea inspired jazz". Paradoxically enough, this might be the most modern Stubø record, in the sense that there are clear elements of jazz rock inspiration for several of the compositions.

Track listing
A side
«Mickey Finn» (7:10) (Thorgeir Stubø)
«Ole Jacob's Ide» (5:55) (Bjørn Alterhaug)
«The Song Is You» (6:35) (Kern-Hammerstein)

B side
«Søndre Gt.11» (9:10) (Terje Bjørklund)
«I Know You Care» (4:15) (Duke Pearson)
«Notice» (3:45) (Thorgeir Stubø)
«Mood» (1:40) (Thorgeir Stubø)

Personnel
Thorgeir Stubø - guitar
Terje Bjørklund - piano & electric piano
Henning Gravkrok - tenor saxophone & soprano saxophone
Bjørn Alterhaug - double bass
Ernst-Wiggo Sandbakk - drums & percussions

Credits
Recorded at Nidaros Studio
Mixed at Nidaros Studio
Cover by Vegar Werner
Design by Bjørn Rybakken
Photography by Ivar Mølsknes
Produced & Engined by Jan Erik Kongshaug

References

Spellemannprisen winners
1981 albums
Thorgeir Stubø albums